Vaiphei is a Sino-Tibetan language belonging to the Kuki-Chin linguistic subbranch of the Tibeto-Burman group of languages. It is spoken mainly in the Indian state of Manipur and minutely in Mizoram, Assam, Meghalaya, and Tripura. The dialect spoken in Manipur exhibits a least partial mutual intelligibility with the other Mizo/Kukish dialects of the area including Thadou, Hmar, Paite, Simte, Kom and Gangte languages.

Geographical distribution
Vaiphei is spoken in more than 30 villages of Churachandpur district, southern Manipur (Ethnologue). There are also speakers in Assam, Meghalaya, Mizoram and Tripura.

References

Sources
 

Kuki-Chin languages
Languages of Manipur
Languages of Assam
Languages of Meghalaya
Languages of Tripura